Sphenopidae is a family of cnidarians.

Genera include:
 Palythoa Lamouroux, 1816
 Sphenopus Steenstrup, 1856

References

 
Brachycnemina
Cnidarian families